Anthony Eviparker is a Nigerian footballer and coach who has played competitively in Israel, Malta and Germany. He aided the Vittoriosa Stars' 2009 promotion to the Premier League. Eviparker has stated that Nigeria should not be circumspect in promoting the Nigeria Professional Football League and that they should "upgrade the footballers' profile".

Career

Israel

Anthony Eviparker received a contract with Ness Ziona's 2009 squad. He shared the same Hebrew name as retired basketball player Anthony Parker, and hoped to have similar success in Israel as his namesake. He left Ness Ziona at the conclusion of 2009, having scored four goals with the club. He finished the season with Mazzabi Herzliya, partnering with Odinaka Ezeocha upfront, and registered four goals. A few months later, he joined Maccabi Be'er Sheva, making 3 goals in 11 appearances.

Malta

Transferring to Balzan on 12 November 2003, Eviparker scored
two goals to hold Floriana 2–2 on his debut with the club, but was investigated by the Malta Football Association regarding his apparent status as an amateur rather than a professional. Reaching an agreement with Floriana the final day of the January 2005 transfer window, he then changed clubs, spending 2007/08 with Vittoriosa Stars where he was penalized with a three-month ban due to insulting the referee that October. Later scoring three goals to defeat St Patrick 3–1 and four to down St George's 7–3, the Reds extended his contract to summer 2009, when he secured their promotion to the Premier League with two goals over Mosta. However, over the course of his years in Malta, the Nigerian experienced racism from his teammates and the public.

Germany

On the roster of TuS Viktoria Rietberg from 2012 to 2013, Eviparker buried two hat-tricks with the club. However, he was not allowed to compete with SW Marienfeld in late April 2015, because the German Football Association restricts footballers to two teams per season, and he had been on the books of two sides – VfB Fichte Bielefeld and Vittoriosa Stars – before Marienfeld.

References

External links 
 Marsa, Iwueke dismiss EviParker's connection with another agency
 Marsa's Asechemie, Eviparker on way to Italy
 Eviparker for Reading trial
 Nervenstarker Eviparker
 Joker Eviparker rettet den Punkt
 FuPa Profile
 Second FuPa Profile
 MFA Profile
 Israel Football Profile
 Ciderspace Profile
 at Soccerway

1985 births
Living people
Nigerian footballers
Nadur Youngsters F.C. players
Marsa F.C. players
Balzan F.C. players
Yeovil Town F.C. players
Floriana F.C. players
Xagħra United F.C. players
Vittoriosa Stars F.C. players
Sektzia Ness Ziona F.C. players
Maccabi Herzliya F.C. players
Maccabi Be'er Sheva F.C. players
FC Gütersloh 2000 players
Maltese Premier League players
Liga Leumit players
Nigerian expatriate footballers
Expatriate footballers in Malta
Expatriate footballers in England
Expatriate footballers in Israel
Expatriate footballers in Germany
Nigerian expatriate sportspeople in Malta
Nigerian expatriate sportspeople in England
Nigerian expatriate sportspeople in Israel
Nigerian expatriate sportspeople in Germany
Association football forwards